The outdoor bust of Alberto Santos-Dumont is installed near the Embassy of Brazil, Washington, D.C., at the corner of 22nd and R Street NW. The bust is made out of bronze.

External links
 
 Santos-Dumont, Alberto bust near the Brazilian Embassy in Washington, D.C. at dcMemorials

See also
 List of public art in Washington, D.C., Ward 2

Bronze sculptures in Washington, D.C.
Busts in Washington, D.C.
Embassy Row
Monuments and memorials in Washington, D.C.
Sculptures of men in Washington, D.C.
Outdoor sculptures in Washington, D.C.
Alberto Santos-Dumont